Pasiphilodes diaboeta is a moth in the family Geometridae. It is endemic to Seram.

References

Moths described in 1958
Eupitheciini